Ryan Lee James (born April 21, 1994) is a Canadian professional soccer player who plays as a defender for HFX Wanderers in the Canadian Premier League.

Early life
James began playing youth soccer at age four with Dixie SC. He later joined the Toronto FC Academy. He was a member of the Ontario provincial team at both the U14 and U16 levels, winning a silver medal at both national tournaments.

College career
In 2012, he committed to attend Bowling Green University to play for the men's soccer team. On September 9, 2012, James recorded his first collegiate goal and his first assist in a 3-3 draw against the Coastal Carolina Chanticleers. On October 30, 2012, he scored a brace in a 3-2 victory over the Wright State Raiders, which earned him Bowling Green's Athlete of the Week honours. In his sophomore season, he was named to the OCSA Academic All-Ohio Second Team and also earned honourable mention honours for the Academic All-MAC Team.

In his junior season, he was named to the NSCAA All-Great Lakes Region Third Team, the All-MAC Second-Team, All-Ohio Second Team, Academic All-MAC Team, a MAC Distinguished Scholar Athlete, and a Academic All-Ohio First Team.

Ahead of his senior season, he was named a team captain. He was named a finalist for the Senior CLASS Award, was named to the All-MAC Second Team, Academic All-MAC Team, MAC Distinguished Scholar Athlete, and was the male recipient of Bowling Green's Medal of Honor. Ahead of the MLS SuperDraft, he was invited to the MLS Combine. Over his four seasons, he played in all 79 of the team's games, scoring nine goals and addind 15 assists.

Club career
In 2012, James began playing with the TFC Academy in the Canadian Soccer League and also appeared in the Premier Development League in a match in 2015.

At the 2016 MLS SuperDraft, James was drafted in the third round (52nd overall) by Sporting Kansas City. He attended pre-season with the team, however, he did not ultimately sign with the club.

In March 2016, James signed with the Rochester Rhinos of the USL.

In December 2017, James signed with Nashville SC in the USL, for the 2018 season.

In November 2018, James signed a one-year contract, with a club option for 2020 with Pittsburgh Riverhounds SC. In April 2019, he was named to the USL Championship Team of the Week for the first time. He scored his first goal for the Riverhounds on August 1, 2020 against Philadelphia Union II. After scoring a brace against the Hartford Athletic on August 28, 2020, James was named USL Championship Player of the Week (and named to the Team of the Week). After another two-goal performance against the Hartford Athletic on September 12, he was once again named to the Team of the Week. For the 2020 season, he was named the Steel Army (the Riverhounds' supporters group) Player of the Year.

In December 2020, James signed a multi-year contract with Birmingham Legion FC. He scored his first goal for the Legion on July 9, 2022 against the Charleston Battery. In July 2022, he was named to the USL Team of the Week.

In February 2023, he signed a one-year contract with a club option for 2024, with the HFX Wanderers in the Canadian Premier League.

International career
He made his debut in the Canadian national program attending a camp with the Canada U17 team in August 2010, later attending a second camp in November 2010.

Personal life
James is the younger brother of Evan James, who is also a professional soccer player. In September 2022, he was the inaugural recipient of the Coaching License Scholarship from Kwik Goal, the United Soccer League, and US Soccer, and will begin with B coaching license training with the United States Soccer Federation.

Career statistics

References

External links

1994 births
Living people
Canadian soccer players
Canadian expatriate soccer players
Bowling Green Falcons men's soccer players
Maryland Terrapins men's soccer players
Rochester New York FC players
Nashville SC (2018–19) players
Association football defenders
Expatriate soccer players in the United States
Sporting Kansas City draft picks
USL Championship players
Toronto FC players
Pittsburgh Riverhounds SC players
Birmingham Legion FC players
Canadian Soccer League (1998–present) players
Soccer players from Mississauga
Canadian sportspeople of Jamaican descent
Black Canadian soccer players
Canadian expatriate sportspeople in the United States
USL League Two players
HFX Wanderers FC players
Canadian Premier League players